The Bermuda Conference was an international conference between the United Kingdom and the United States held from April 19 to 30, 1943, at Hamilton, Bermuda. The topic of discussion was the question of Jewish refugees who had been liberated by Allied forces and those who still remained in Nazi-occupied Europe. The only agreement reached was that the war must be won against the Nazis. US immigration quotas were not raised, and the British prohibition on Jewish refugees seeking refuge in Mandatory Palestine was not lifted.

The American delegation was led by Dr. Harold W. Dodds. The British delegation was led by Richard Law, a junior minister at the Foreign Office.

Reaction
An article in The New York Times dated April 30, 1943, "Hopeful Hint Ends Bermuda Sessions", stated that the delegates had rejected recommendations that were not capable of being accomplished under war conditions and that would most likely delay the war effort.

A week later, the Zionist Committee for a Jewish Army ran an advertisement in The New York Times condemning the efforts at Bermuda as a mockery of past promises to the Jewish people and of Jewish suffering under German Nazi occupation. US Senator Harry S. Truman withdrew his membership from the committee over what was perceived as an insult to members of the US Senate, which had been involved in the conference.

Szmul Zygielbojm,  a member of the Jewish advisory body to the Polish government-in-exile, committed suicide in protest at the outcome of the conference.

See also 
 Évian Conference in 1938
International response to the Holocaust
 Jewish refugees from German-occupied Europe in the United Kingdom

References

External links
Bermuda Conference from Yad Vashem's Shoa Research Centre
The Allies' Refugee Conference--A "Cruel Mockery" by Dr. Rafael Medoff
Bermuda Conference (Encyclopedia of America's Response to the Holocaust) on The David S. Wyman Institute for Holocaust Studies

World War II conferences
International response to the Holocaust
History of Bermuda
Bermuda in World War II
Diplomatic conferences in Bermuda
1943 conferences
1943 in Bermuda
The Holocaust and the United Kingdom
The Holocaust and the United States
1943 in international relations
United Kingdom–United States relations
20th century in Hamilton, Bermuda
April 1943 events
1943 in Judaism